Insulin degludec/insulin aspart, sold under the brand name Ryzodeg, is a fixed-dose combination medication for the treatment of diabetes mellitus. It contains insulin degludec and insulin aspart. It is given as an injection under the skin in the abdominal wall (at the front of the waist), upper arm or thigh.

The most frequently reported side effect is hypoglycemia (low blood glucose levels).

It was approved for medical use in the European Union in January 2013, and in Australia in November 2017.


Medical uses 
Insulin degludec/insulin aspart is indicated for the treatment of diabetes mellitus in adults, adolescents and children from the age of two years.

Insulin degludec and insulin aspart are slightly different from human insulin. The differences mean that insulin degludec is absorbed more slowly by the body. This means it has a long duration of action. Meanwhile, insulin aspart is absorbed faster by the body than human insulin, and therefore it starts to work as soon as it is injected and has a short duration of action.

References

External links 
 
 

Diabetes
Human proteins
Insulin receptor agonists
Insulin therapies
Peptide hormones
Recombinant proteins